Pon Radhakrishnan (born 1 March 1952) is an Indian politician from Tamil Nadu,  representing the Bharatiya Janata Party. He was the Minister of State in the Ministry of Finance and Ministry of Shipping between May 2014 and May 2019. Earlier, he served in the Union Minister of State for Road Transport & Highways in the NDA government. He has served as the minister of state for Youth affairs and Minister of State in the Ministry of Housing and Urban Poverty Alleviation in Third Vajpayee Ministry. He is elected to Lok Sabha from Kanyakumari in Tamil Nadu in 2014. He lost in the recent 2019 and 2021 (by-election) parliamentary elections.

Personal life 
Radhakrishnan was born on March 1, 1952, in Alanthangarai village, Kanyakumari district to his father Ponnaya Ayyappan and mother Thangakani into a traditional Congress family, Radhakrishnan holds a B.A. Degree in Government Law College, Chennai.

Political career

Early political career 
After Kamaraj's demise, some of his family members joined the Janata Party. Radhakrishnan's brother Ramakrishnan joined the Hindu Nationalist Jana Sangh and took charge as the district chairman. Radhakrishnan's uncle Chidambaram Athiswami Nadar contested and won the Colachal constituency in the 1977 elections on behalf of the Janata Party. In 1981, Radhakrishnan joined a Rashtriya Swayamsevak Sangh (RSS) and later became its secretary. Later, Radhakrishnan's father Ponnaya Ayyappan was elected as the District President of Vishwa Hindu Parishad (VHP).

Radhakrishnan joined the Hindu Munnani which was started in 1980, began to grow slowly in the Kanyakumari district. He traveled with its founder Rama Gopalan throughout Tamil Nadu for about a year as his assistant. He also worked as a co-organizer of the Hindu Munnani in the state.

Radhakrishnan contested the Lok Sabha elections in Nagercoil for the first time in the 1991 elections. Despite being in the Hindu Munnani at the time, he contested as a BJP candidate and got 1 lakh 2 thousand 29 votes.

As minister 
Pon Radhakrishnan won the 1999 Lok Sabha election from Nagercoil constituency and became Minister of State for Youth Affairs in the Atal Bihari Vajpayee-led NDA government of 1999–2004. Later, he also served as Minister of State for Urban Development and Poverty Alleviation. Pon Radhakrishnan lost the elections in 2004, 2009 , 2019 and 2021 by- election.

He was president of Tamil Nadu state unit of the Bharatiya Janata Party, resigning the position when he became a Minister of State in the Narendra Modi-led government. He had won in a Lok Sabha seat in the 2014 Indian general election, from Kanyakumari constituency by a margin of 1,28,662 votes. During this tenure, he served as Minister of State in various portfolios like Heavy Industries, Shipping and Finance. 

Pon. Radhakrishnan participated in a BJP rally in support of Citizenship (Amendment) Act, 2019 in Nagercoil in March 2020 where he spoke of chasing away Christian priests from the district. Many demanded that action be taken against Pon. Radhakrishnan for his communal speech which can incite violence. Police complaints were also filed against him.

He lost the elections in 2019 to H. Vasanthakumar from Indian National Congress.                
                 
After the death of Vasanthakumar, he again contest in 2021 by-election. But he was defeated by Vijay Vasanth who the son of late Vasanthakumar.

Political views
Radhakrishnan in 2019 asked Tamil people to study Hindi and Sanskrit. He said that could not learn Sanskrit for various reasons and that he was ashamed of it. He also said that Sanskrit and Tamil are equal. He also urged parents to let their children to learn Sanskrit.

Controversies

Fishermen vote controversy 

Fishermen in Kanniyakumari claimed that around 40,000 - 45,000 fishermen votes in the 48 coastal hamlets in Kanyakumari Lok Sabha constituency was deliberately removed from the electoral-list out of fear that the fishermen would vote against the lone BJP Union minister, Pon Radhakrishnan, contesting in the constituency during the 2019 Lok sabha elections. The coastal fishermen also complained that votes of inland fishermen in another 68 villages also have been removed purposely. They also alleged that their names were removed only a few days before the day of polling.

Other controversies 
In September 2019, Radhakrishnan created a controversy after calling Tamil people as 'ungrateful'.He explained that the Tamil people failed to celebrate Modi after he praised the Tamil language. Later he claimed that he did not call all Tamils as ungrateful and only those doing politics with the language.

Elections

Lok Sabha Elections

Positions
 1999 - Elected to 13th Lok Sabha.
 1999 to 2000 - Member, Standing Committee on Industry.
 2000 - Member, Consultative Committee, Ministry of Surface Transport.
 2000 to 2003 - Minister of State, Ministry of Youth Affairs and Sports.
 2003 -  Minister of State, Ministry of Urban Development and Poverty Alleviation.
 2003 -  Minister of State, Ministry of Road Transport and Highways.
 2014 - Re-elected to 16th Lok Sabha (2nd term).
 2014 to 2014 - Minister of State, Heavy Industries and Public Enterprises
 2014 to 2017-  Minister of State, Ministry of Road Transport and Highways and Ministry of Shipping
 2017 to 2019 -  Minister of State, Ministry of Finance and Ministry of Shipping

References

External links

Facebook page
Twitter page
Website

1952 births
Living people
Union Ministers from Tamil Nadu
Lok Sabha members from Tamil Nadu
India MPs 1999–2004
India MPs 2014–2019
Bharatiya Janata Party politicians from Tamil Nadu
People from Nagercoil
Narendra Modi ministry
People from Kanyakumari district